Stocklands Bilruter AS was a bus company operating in the municipality of Hamarøy in Nordland county, Norway.  It operated on a contract with the Nordland county municipality.

The company was founded in 1924 by Ludvig Stokland that started operation with a Ford Model T. A few years later he started scheduled services between Presteid and Skutvika and also between Hamsund and Buvåg. In 1935, he bought his first bus. The company became a limited company in 1959, and by 1986 Stockland Bilruter had 29 vehicles. The next year, it was bought by Saltens Bilruter.

References

Bus companies of Nordland
Hamarøy
Defunct bus companies of Norway
Transport companies established in 1924
1924 establishments in Norway
Transport companies disestablished in 1987
1987 disestablishments in Norway